George W. Bernhardt (June 15, 1919 – December 6, 1987) was an American football guard and coach.

Bernhardt was born in Berwyn, Illinois in 1919 and attended Brookfield High School. He played college football at Illinois.

He played professional football as a guard in the All-America Football Conference for the Brooklyn Dodgers from 1946 to 1948 and for the Chicago Rockets in 1948. He appeared in 30 games, 24 as a starter. 

After retiring as a player, he worked as a football coach. He was an assistant football coach at Washburn from 1949 to 1950, at Wichita from 1951 to 1954, at Arkansas from 1955 to 1957, at Kansas from 1958 to 1966, at Vanderbilt from 1967 to 1970, and again at Kansas starting 1971.

He lived in his later years in Lawrence, Kansas. He died in 1987 in an automobile accident at Garnett, Kansas.

References

1919 births
1987 deaths
People from Berwyn, Illinois
Sportspeople from Lawrence, Kansas
American football guards
Brooklyn Dodgers (AAFC) players
Chicago Rockets players
Illinois Fighting Illini football players
Players of American football from Illinois
Washburn Ichabods football coaches
Wichita State Shockers football coaches
Arkansas Razorbacks football coaches
Kansas Jayhawks football coaches
Vanderbilt Commodores football coaches
Road incident deaths in Kansas